Stony Creek (also known as Stoney Creek or Rausch Creek) is a  tributary of the Susquehanna River in Dauphin County, Pennsylvania, in the United States.

Stony Creek joins the Susquehanna River at the borough of Dauphin.

Stony Creek is a designated Pennsylvania Scenic River from its headwaters to the gate of Pennsylvania State Game Lands 211.  Included in this designation are three smaller tributary streams: Rattling Run, Rausch Creek and Yellow Springs.

Stony Creek was so named from its stony river bed.

Tributaries
Rattling Run (Stony Creek)
Rausch Creek (Stony Creek)
Yellow Springs (Pennsylvania)

See also
List of rivers of Pennsylvania
Stoney Creek (Delaware River tributary)

References

External links
Pennsylvania Scenic Rivers website

Rivers of Pennsylvania
Tributaries of the Susquehanna River
Rivers of Dauphin County, Pennsylvania
Scenic Rivers of Pennsylvania
Protected areas of Dauphin County, Pennsylvania